The Mopani Copper Mines COSAFA Under-20 Championship will be the 24th edition of the COSAFA U20 Cup, an international youth competition open to national associations of the COSAFA region.

The competition is open to players born on or before 1 January 1998.

Participants

The following teams are expected to participate:

 
  (Invitee)
 
 
 
 
 
 
 
  (Invitee)
  (Host)

Draw

The group stage draw was be held on 9 November 2017 in Johannesburg, South Africa.

Venues

Group stage

Group A

Group B

Group C

Knockout stage

Semi-finals

Notes

Bronze medal match

Final

References 

U-20
2017
2017 in Zambian sport
International association football competitions hosted by Zambia